Rebecca Field is an American actress. She is best known for her role as Lacey Jean-Locklin in the Lifetime drama series The Client List. She is also known for the role of Gail in the 2018 film A Star Is Born.

Life and career
Field was born in Lenox, Massachusetts. She attended Bridgewater State University, and in her early career has played minor roles in various television shows and movies,including Monk.

Field was cast in her first series regular role of Janet in the ABC short-lived television series October Road from 2007 to 2008. In R. Kelly's hip-hop opera, Trapped in the Closet, she played the role of Bridget. In 2009, she played a recurring role as social worker Susan Winters alongside Jada Pinkett Smith in TNT's Hawthorne. Field has also made guest appearances on shows such as Dollhouse, Drop Dead Diva, The Mentalist, Lie to Me, Mike & Molly, Criminal Minds, CSI: Crime Scene Investigation, Castle, and Body of Proof.

From 2012 to 2013, Field played Lacey on The Client List starring Jennifer Love Hewitt, on Lifetime.

In 2018 Field won an audition for a cameo role in A Star Is Born as Gail, a concert assistant who welcomes Lady Gaga's character Ally to a performance at the Greek Theatre as the guest of Bradley Cooper's character, singer Jackson Maine. Field's smiling, put-together character, who also improvised some of her lines, was warmly received by film audiences.

Filmography

Film

Television

References

External links

Year of birth missing (living people)
Living people
American television actresses
American film actresses
Actresses from Massachusetts
People from Lenox, Massachusetts
Bridgewater State University alumni
21st-century American actresses